Ehret is a surname. Notable people with the surname include:

 Arno Ehret (born 1953), German handball player 
 Arnold Ehret (1866–1922), German health educator
 Charles Frederick Ehret (died 2007), World War II veteran  
 Christopher Ehret (born 1941), professor of African History
 Fabrice Ehret (born 1979), French football player 
 Georg Dionysius Ehret (1708–1770), botanical illustrator
 Gloria Ehret, professional golfer
 Red Ehret, (1868–1940), American baseball player

See also
 John Ehret High School